Inambari may refer to :

 Inambari River, Peru
 Inambari District, Tambopata, Peru
 Alto Inambari District, Sandia, Peru